Stob Law is a hill in the Manor Hills range, part of the Southern Uplands of Scotland. It is normally climbed as an outlier of the Dun Rig horseshoe, starting from Peebles.

References

Mountains and hills of the Scottish Borders
Mountains and hills of the Southern Uplands
Donald mountains